Michael or Mike May may refer to:

 Michael May (racing driver) (born 1934), Swiss racing driver
 Mike May (Iowa politician) (born 1945), Iowa House of Representatives
 Mike May (skier) (born 1954), Paralympic alpine skier
 Michael May (cricketer) (born 1971), English cricketer
 Michael May (actor), (born 1999), American actor and model